Aeonium nobile is a succulent, subtropical flowering plant in the family Crassulaceae. It is native to the island of La Palma in the Canary Islands, where it grows on dry slopes and cliffs at altitudes up to 800m. The inflorescences are large and spreading with bright red flowers.

References

nobile
Endemic flora of the Canary Islands
Plants described in 1929